Asif Hussain (born 20 November 1979) is a Pakistani first-class cricketer who played for Faisalabad.

References

External links
 

1979 births
Living people
Pakistani cricketers
Faisalabad cricketers
Cricketers from Faisalabad
Faisalabad Wolves cricketers